The Mindanao blue fantail (Rhipidura superciliaris) is a species of bird in the family Rhipiduridae. It is one of 47 species in the genus Rhipidura.

It is endemic to the Philippines. Its natural habitat is subtropical or tropical moist lowland forests.  It was previously conspecific with the Visayan blue fantail.

References

Sánchez-González, L.A., and R.G. Moyle. 2011. Molecular systematic and species limits in the Philippine fantails (Aves: Rhipidura). Molecular Phylogenetics and Evolution 61: 290-299

Mindanao blue fantail
Birds of Mindanao
Mindanao blue fantail
Taxonomy articles created by Polbot